Elvira is a female given name. First recorded in medieval Spain, it is likely of Germanic (Gothic) origin.

Elvira may refer to:

People

Nobility
 Elvira Menéndez (died 921), daughter of Hermenegildo Gutiérrez and wife of Ordoño II of León
 Elvira of Castile, Queen of León (965–1017)
 Elvira of Castile, Queen of Sicily (c. 1100–1135), wife of Roger II, King of Sicily
 Elvira of Castile, Countess of Toulouse (before 1082?-1151)
 Elvira of Toro (1038/9–1101), daughter of King Ferdinand I of León
 Elvira Menéndez (died 1022), Queen of León (1008–1022), wife of Alfonso V of León
 Elvira Ramírez (c. 935–after 986), princess and regent of León

Arts and entertainment
 Elvira Amazar (1890s-1971), Serbian-born Russian-American soprano singer and actress
 Elvira Barney (1904-1936), English actress and socialite
 Elvira Betrone (1881–1961), Italian actress
 Elvira Casazza (1887–1965), Italian mezzo-soprano
 Elvira Cristi (born 1976), Chilean actress and model
 Elvira Gascón (1911-2000), Spanish painter and engraver
 Elvira Godeanu (1904–1991), Romanian stage actress
 Elvira de Hidalgo (1891-1980), Spanish coloratura soprano and teacher of Maria Callas
 Elvira Kralj (1900-1978), Slovenian actress
 Elvira Kurt (born 1961), Canadian comedian
 Elvira Madigan (1867-1889), Danish tightrope walker and trick rider
 Elvira Natali (born 1996), Indonesian actress and author
 Elvira Navarro (born 1978), Spanish writer
 Elvira Nikolaisen (born 1980), Norwegian singer-songwriter
 Elvira Notari (1875-1946), Italian filmmaker
 Elvira Pagã (1920-2003), Brazilian actress and singer
 Elvira Popescu (1894-1993), Romanian-born French actress and director
 Elvira Quintana (1935–1968), Spanish-born Mexican actress and singer
 Elvira Rahić (born 1973), Bosnian pop-folk singer
 Elvira Ríos (1913-1987), Mexican actress and singer 
 Elvira T (born 1994), Russian pop singer
 Elvira Travesí (1919-2009) was a Peruvian-born Argentinean actress
 Elvira, Mistress of the Dark, stage name of Cassandra Peterson (born 1951)

Politicians
 Elvira Abdić-Jelenović (born 1967), Bosnian politician
Elvira Aitkulova (born 1973), Russian politician
 Elvira Badaracco (1911-1994), Italian politician
 Elvira Pola Figueroa (born 1957), Mexican politician
 Elvira Kovács (born 1982), Serbian politician
 Elvira Olivas (born 1935), Mexican politician
 Elvira "Pixie" Palladino (1932-2006), American politician
 Elvira Rodríguez (born 1949), Spanish politician and economist
 Elvira Rodríguez Leonardi, Argentine politician
 Maria Elvira Salazar (born 1961), American journalist and broadcast television anchor, U.S. Representative from Florida.

Sports
 Elvira Guerra (1855–1937), Italian equestrienne
 Elvira Herman (born 1997), Belarusian sprinter
 Elvira Holzknecht (born 1973), Austrian retired luger
 Elvira Khasyanova (born 1981), Russian synchronized swimmer
 Elvira Öberg (born 1999), Swedish biathlete
 Elvīra Ozoliņa (born 1939), Latvian and former Soviet javelin thrower
 Elvira Pančić (born 1980), Serbian sprinter
 Elvira Possekel (born 1953), German athlete
 Elvira Saadi (born 1952), retired artistic gymnast from the former Soviet Union
 Elvira Shatayeva, Russian professional mountain climber
 Elvira Stinissen (born 1979),  Dutch Paralympic sitting volleyball player
 Elvira Todua (born 1986), Abkhazian Russian football goalkeeper
 Elvira Urusova (born 1968), Georgian athlete
 Elvira Vasilkova (born 1962), Belarusian former swimmer
 Elvira Ziyastinova (born 1991), Russian footballer

Other
 Elvira Arellano (born 1975), Mexican international activist, undocumented immigrant to the US and cause célèbre
 Elvira Cuevas, Puerto Rican ecologist
 Elvira Devinamira, Indonesian beauty pageant titleholder
 Elvira Dolinar (1870–1961), Slovenian writer, feminist and teacher
 Elvira Fölzer (1868–after 1928), German archaeologist
 Elvira Lindo (born 1962), Spanish journalist and writer
 Elvira Lobato, Brazilian journalist
 Elvira Tânia Lopes Martins (born 1957), Brazilian poet
 Elvira Nabiullina (born 1963), head of the Central Bank of Russia
 Elvira Notari (1875–1946), Italian filmmaker
 Elvira Willman (1875–1925), Finnish playwright, journalist and revolutionary socialist
 Elvira Wood (1865–1928), American paleontologist who specialized in vertebrate paleontology

Fictional characters
 Elvira, Mistress of the Dark, portrayed by Cassandra Peterson in television and film 
 Elvira Coot (Grandma Duck), grandmother of Donald Duck
 Elvira, the title character of Noël Coward's Blithe Spirit
 Elvira, heroine of the opera I puritani
 Elvira, heroine of the opera Ernani
 Elvira, in the opera L'italiana in Algeri
 Donna Elvira, in the opera Don Giovanni
 Elvira, in the 1667 play Elvira by George Digby, 2nd Earl of Bristol
 Elvira, title character in the 1763 play Elvira by David Mallet
 Elvira Almiraghi, portrayed by Franca Valeri in the 1959 film Il vedovo
 Elvira Dutton, in Margaret Walker's book on slavery, Jubilee
 Elvira Hancock, Tony Montana's love interest, portrayed by Michelle Pfeiffer in the 1983 film Scarface
 Elvira Stitt, in the novel Whatever Happened to Baby Jane? and the 1963 film adaptation
 Elvira, in the 2005 novel Ingo by Helen Dunmore

French feminine given names
Italian feminine given names
Spanish feminine given names
Portuguese feminine given names
Romanian feminine given names
Russian feminine given names